Warumpi Band were an Australian country and Aboriginal rock group which formed in the outback settlement of Papunya, Northern Territory, in 1980. The original line-up was George Burarrwanga on vocals and didgeridoo, Gordon Butcher Tjapanangka on drums, his brother Sammy Butcher Tjapanangka on guitar and bass guitar, and Neil Murray on rhythm guitar and backing vocals. Their songs are in English, Luritja and Gumatj. Their key singles are "Jailanguru Pakarnu" (1983), "Blackfella/Whitefella" (1985), "Sit Down Money" (1986), "My Island Home" (1987) and "No Fear" (1987). The group released three albums, Big Name, No Blankets (1985), Go Bush! (1987) and Too Much Humbug (1996). From late 1987 to mid-1995 the group rarely performed as Murray focused on his solo career. In early 1995, Christine Anu (former backing singer in Murray's touring group, The Rainmakers), issued a cover version of "My Island Home". Warumpi Band regrouped before disbanding in 2000. Burarrwanga died on 10 June 2007 of lung cancer.

History
Neil Murray was a Victorian-born schoolteacher and labourer who was working in the region. He met local brothers Gordon Butcher Tjapanangka and Sammy Butcher Tjapanangka of the Luritja people; and were joined by Sammy's brother-in-law George Rrurrambu Burarrwanga (aka George Djilangya), visiting from Elcho Island's Yolngu people. Murray provided rhythm guitar and backing vocals, Gordon was on drums, Sammy on guitar and bass guitar, and Burarrwanga on vocals and didgeridoo. 'Warumpi' derives from the Luritja word for a "honey-ant dreaming site", Warumpinya, which lies near Papunya. The band was first called Warumpinya Band, as "the band from Warumpinya", but this was later shortened to Warumpi Band. Over the years, many different people played in the band at various times. The only consistent elements were Murray and Burarrwanga, with Sammy Butcher generally being available when band commitments did not take him too far from home for long.

The group began by playing cover versions of rock 'n' roll standards and toured the Northern Territory and the Kimberley region of northern Western Australia. In 1983 at the Aboriginal Country Music Festival they were voted as best band and by that stage they were playing more original material. In October that year they released their debut single, "Jailanguru Pakarnu" (Luritja for Out from Jail) on the Hot label. It is the first song released in a rock music format which uses an Aboriginal language, Luritja. For the single they were joined by another Butcher brother, Brian, on bass guitar. The track created mainstream media interest, and the group travelled to the interstate capitals of Melbourne and Sydney for gigs and TV appearances.

Warumpi Band built up a loyal following in Sydney's northern beaches pub rock scene, and played as a support act to Midnight Oil. In 1985 the band signed with Midnight Oil's Powderworks label and released their debut album, Big Name, No Blankets in April. Australian rock music historian, Ian McFarlane, felt although "[g]rounded in early American R&B and boogie as it was, the album was nevertheless an honest, enduring and bare-boned slice of indigenous country music". Big Name, No Blankets featured the single, "Blackfella/Whitefella", which appeared in October. The group undertook a national tour as well as playing in Papua New Guinea, Solomon Islands and Vanuatu.

In 1986, Midnight Oil and Warumpi Band embarked on the Blackfella/Whitefella Tour which reached some of the country's remotest locations. In July, while on tour, "Blackfella/Whitefella" was re-released as a track on the B-side of Midnight Oil's 12" shared single, "The Dead Heart", and included tour mate Coloured Stone's track "This Land". After the tour the Butcher brothers left and the group signed with Festival Records' imprint Parole Records. In October and November Burarrwanga and Murray were joined by Kenny Smith (later part of the Sunrize Band) on bass guitar and backing vocals, and American-born Allen Murphy on drums to record their second album, Go Bush!. It appeared in April 1987 and Murray Cook had joined on keyboards. In February that year they issued their next single, "My Island Home", which had been written by Neil Murray for George Burarrwanga after visiting Burarrwanga's homeland on Elcho Island.

The tour had inspired Midnight Oil's album, Diesel and Dust (August 1987), which was an international hit and brought the issues of land rights and aboriginal reconciliation into the national spotlight. For Warumpi Band the strain of balancing family commitments with the group took its toll and they were unable to capitalise on the groundswell created by the tour and their second album. By the end of 1988 Murray had embarked upon a solo career, although the band periodically reformed whenever it fitted in with their other activities. Murray issued his debut album, Calm & Crystal Clear, in 1989.

In 1995 Christine Anu (former backing singer in Murray's touring band, The Rainmakers) covered "My Island Home". Soon after Burarrwanga, Sammy Butcher and Murray reconvened Warrumpi Band for a European tour. In April 1996 they released their third album, Too Much Humbug. The album was produced by Mark Ovenden (Yothu Yindi, Midnight Oil, You Am I). At the ARIA Music Awards of 1997 the track, "Stompin' Ground", was nominated for 'Best Indigenous Release'. In the following years, reunion gigs were sporadic, generally for festivals and other one-off appearances. In 2000 Murray resigned from Warumpi Band and concentrated on his solo career which had already provided three further albums, These Hands (1993), Dust (1996) and The Wondering Kind (1999).

Burarrwanga continued to perform as a solo artist, and released a reggae album, Nerbu Message (2004), which included his version of "My Island Home" as "Ronu Wanga", sung in his native Gumatj dialect. In 2007, he returned to his 'Island Home' on Elcho Island where he died from lung cancer on 10 June of that year. Sammy Butcher remained involved in music with a recording studio in Alice Springs, providing recording opportunities for outback youth. He recorded his own album of instrumental guitar tracks, Desert Surf Guitar (2002).

In 2015, Festival Records released the Warumpi Band 4 Ever box set, containing the band's three albums plus bonuses across two CDs. CD1 contained Big Name, No Blankets and Go Bush, whilst CD2 contained Too Much Humbug and the following bonus tracks: an unreleased live recording from the band's final concert in Broome in 2000, the non-album A-side "Sitdown Money" that was later added to the Parole Records releases of Big Name, No Blankets, the original recording of "Jailanguru pakarnu" released as a single in 1983 and four demos recorded in 1981.

Members
Various members were temporary, touring or recording only. From late 1987 to early 1995 there was little group activity as members pursued other interests.
 George Rrurrambu Burarrwanga – vocals, didgeridoo (1980–2000, d. 2007)
 Gordon Butcher Tjapanangka – drums (1980–1987, 1996)
 Sammy Butcher Tjapanangka – bass guitar, guitar (1980–2000)
 Neil Murray – guitar, songwriter (1980–2000)
 Brian Butcher – bass guitar (1983)
 Murray Cook – keyboards (1987)
 Alan Murphey – drums (1987)
 Kenny Smith – bass guitar (1987)
 Bill Heckenberg – drums (1996)
 Bill Jacobi – bass guitar, backing vocals
 Denis Minor – bass guitar
 Hilary Wirra – bass guitar

Discography

Albums

Big Name, No Blankets 
Warumpi Band's debut album was recorded during five days in Sydney, at Trafalgar studios. It was released in 1985 on Powderworks Records (POW 6098) as cassette and vinyl. The name of the album originates from a response by Burarrwanga to their friends, that thought they must be rich since they were famous: "no we only got big name, no blankets".

Track listing 
 "Waru (Fire)" (Murray, Burarrwanga)
 "Blackfella/Whitefella" (Murray, Burarrwanga)
 "Breadline" (Murray)
 "Nyuntu Nyaaltjirriku (What Are You Going To Do)" (Murray, S. Butcher, Burarrwanga)
 "Animal Song" (Murray, Burarrwanga)
 "Warumpinya (Papunya)" (Murray, S. Butcher)
 "Wiima Tjuta (All the Kids)" (Murray, Burarrwanga)
 "Fitzroy Crossing" (Murray)
 "Mulga & Spinifex Plain" (Murray)
 "Gotta Be Strong" (S. Butcher, Murray, Burarrwanga)

Go Bush! 
Warumpi Band's second album was released in 1987 on Parole, Festival (C38707) in cassette, vinyl and CD format.

Track listing 
 "No Fear" (Murray, Tallis)
 "Jailanguru Pakarnu (Out From Jail)" (Murray, S. Butcher)
 "Yolngu Boy" (Mandawuy Yunupingu)
 "Secret War"
 "My Island Home"
 "Didjeridoo Blue"
 "Kintorelakutu (Towards Kintore)" (Murray, S. Butcher, Maxwell, Baldock)
 "Tjiluru Tjiluru (Sad and Lonely)" (Burarrwanga, Murray, S. Butcher, Ian Anderson)
 "My Countryside"
 "Falling Down"
 "From the Bush"

Too Much Humbug 
Warumpi Band's final album was released in 1996 on CAAMA Music (CAAMA 260) in CD format. The name of the CD is based on the pressure from other people on the band to release an album, as "humbug" in Aboriginal and Torres Strait Islander communities is slang for making unreasonable or excessive demands, see Humbug (Aboriginal).

Track listing 
 "Wayathul"
 "Stompin' Ground"
 "Makes You Feel"
 "Never Change"
 "Djulpan"
 "Stars"
 "Cold Weather"
 "Marrayilyil"
 "Joining My Life"
 "Koori Man"
 "Holdin' You in My Arms"
 "We Shall Cry"
 "Blackfella/Whitefella (Remake)"

Warumpi Band 4 Ever 
This compilation album of 2 CDs was released in 2015 on Festival Records (FEST601040). It included all Warumpi Band's three albums as well as some bonus tracks.

Track listing - Bonus tracks 
 "Yaka Bayungu (I Have Nothing)" (live Broome 2000)
 "Sitdown Money" (Powderworks A-side, 1986)
 "Jailanguru Pakarnu (Out From Jail)" (Hot Records A-side, 1983)
 "Route 66" (CAAMA cassette, 1983)
 "It's All Over Now" (CAAMA cassette, 1983)
 "Promised Land" (CAAMA cassette, 1983)
 "Warumpi Rock" (CAAMA cassette, 1983)

Singles

Awards

ARIA Music Awards
The ARIA Music Awards is an annual awards ceremony that recognises excellence, innovation, and achievement across all genres of Australian music. They commenced in 1987. 

|-
| 1988
| Go Bush
| ARIA Award for Best Indigenous Release
| 
|-
| 1996
| Too Much Humbug
| ARIA Award for Best Indigenous Release
| 
|-
| 1997
| Stompin' Ground
| ARIA Award for Best Indigenous Release
| 
|-

See also
Luritja
Gumatj language

References

General
  Note: Archived [on-line] copy has limited functionality.
Specific

External links
Warumpi Band on Neil Murray's official website
"Mates, Mabo and Warumpi", Neil Murray interview by Sally Mitchell, GreenLeft Online, 24 July 1996
 Listen to an excerpt of 'Jailanguru Pakarnu' on australianscreen online
 'Jailanguru Pakarnu' was added to the Sounds of Australia registry in 2007 by National Film and Sound Archive

APRA Award winners
Australian country rock groups
Australian blues rock groups
Indigenous Australian musical groups
Northern Territory musical groups
Musical groups established in 1980
Musical groups disestablished in 1987
Musical groups reestablished in 1995
Musical groups disestablished in 2000